Blackmailer is a 1936 American comedy thriller film directed by Gordon Wiles and starring William Gargan, Florence Rice, and H.B. Warner. It was produced and distributed by Columbia Pictures.

Synopsis
An incompetent police inspector and an equally foolish private detective both become involved in a blackmail case.

Main cast
 William Gargan as Peter Cornish  
 Florence Rice as Joan Rankin  
 H.B. Warner as Michael Rankin  
 Nana Bryant as Mrs. Lindsay   
 Wyrley Birch as Nelson  
 Drue Leyton as Lydia Rankin  
 Paul Hurst as Inspector Killian  
 Kenneth Thomson as Mr. Porter  
 Boyd Irwin as Dr. Lindsay  
 Alexander Cross as Jack Donovan 
 Herman Bing as Dr. Rosenkrantz - Coroner

References

Bibliography
 Larry Langman & Daniel Finn. A Guide to American Crime Films of the Thirties. Greenwood Press, 1995.

External links
 

1936 films
1930s thriller drama films
American thriller drama films
Films directed by Gordon Wiles
Columbia Pictures films
American black-and-white films
1936 drama films
1930s English-language films
1930s American films